The Ijesha (written as Ìjẹ̀ṣà in Yoruba orthography) are a sub-ethnicity of the Yorubas of West Africa. Ilesha is the largest town and historic cultural capital of the Ijesha people, and is home to a kingdom of the same name, ruled by an Oba locally styled as the Owa Obokun Adimula. The present ruling family of Ijesha is the Aromolaran family with the  current reigning Owa Obokun being Oba Gabriel Adekunle Aromolaran.

Geography
Ijeshaland is located at latitude 8.92°N and Longitude 3.42°E. It lies in a forested region at the heart of the Yoruba country west of the Effon ridge which separate the Ijeshas from the Ekitis to their east, and at the intersection of roads from Ile-Ife, Oshogbo, Ado Ekiti and Akure. 
The Ijesa cultural area presently covers six local government councils within Osun state and Okemesi currently the headquarter of Okemesi/Ido-ile LCDA in Ekiti State of Nigeria.

The Ijesha territory is adjoined by the Ekiti on the east, the Igbomina to the north, the Ife to the south, and the Oyo and Ibolo to the west.

The nationally famous  Olumirin waterfalls, more popularly known as Erin-Ijesha Waterfalls is located in Ijeshaland.

Ijeshaland is rich in Gold has the largest deposit in Nigeria

History
The word Ìjèsà comes from the phrase ijè òòsà, meaning food of the gods. This name was given because neighboring enemies often exclusively raided Ijesha towns for humans to sacrifice to the orisha. The Ijesha may have lost some territory to their neighbours during various conflicts and wars of the nineteenth and preceding centuries. The people of Oke-Ako, Irele, Omuo-Oke are said to speak a dialect similar to Ijesha.

Ilesa

The city state of Ilesa (Ile ti a sa, which means "a homeland we chose") is the traditional headquarters of Ijesaland. It was founded in c.1250 by Owaluse, a grandson of Ajibogun Ajaka Owa Obokun Onida Arara, one of the most accomplished great-grandsons of Oduduwa, the royal progenitor of the Yoruba race of South-Western Nigeria, Benin Republic and Togo. The city was described by Rev. William Howard Clark in 1854 as:

For its cleanliness, regularity in breadth and width, and  the straightness of its streets, the ancient city of Ilesa far surpasses any native town I have seen in black Africa.

The Ijesha royal family
The Ijesha royals all claim descent from Oba Oduduwa by way of Ajibogun. In addition to serving as rulers of Ijeshaland, the dynasty has also contributed to the development of other powerful kingdoms in Yorubaland. The ruling houses of the Akure Kingdom, for example, claim descent from the Owas by way of Princess Owawejokun, a daughter of Owa Atakunmosa.

The rulers of the Kingdom have been:

References

Yoruba subgroups